The 1st Squadron, 75th Cavalry Regiment (1-75 CAV) is a United States Army cavalry squadron established in 2004. It is the Reconnaissance, Surveillance and Target Acquisition Squadron (RSTA) squadron of the 2nd Brigade Combat Team "Strike" ♥, 101st Airborne Division (Air Assault). It performs reconnaissance and cavalry missions in support of that brigade.

Activation
1st Squadron, 75th Cavalry ("Widowmakers"), an RSTA, was formed under the U.S. Army's transformation in September 2004. The squadron was formed under 2nd Infantry Brigade Combat Team "Strike", 101st Airborne Division in place of 3-502nd Infantry. The first commander of the squadron was LTC Alfonso J. Ahuja with CSM Scott C. Schroeder. The Squadron's lineage dates back to World War II, as the 705th Tank Destroyer Battalion which was attached to the 502nd Infantry Regiment. The motto of 1-75 CAV (Widowmakers) is ONE ROUND!

Deployment and training
The 1-75 Cavalry deployed to Iraq in support of Operation Iraqi Freedom in the autumn of 2005. The squadron remained with 2BCT, 101st Airborne Division based out of Camp Striker. The squadron, along with the rest of 2BCT, patrolled Southwest Baghdad in an area known as the "triangle of death". 1-75 CAV is noted for locating and destroying multiple weapons caches as well as detaining several ranking members of Al-Qaeda in Iraq. In January 2006 the Squadron was moved to protect a deadly Main Supply Route (MSR) leading into Baghdad.

While controlling this supply route, the squadron successfully decreased improvised explosive device and small arms attacks by over 80%, thus enabling the safe transport of supplies and materials into central and northern Iraq. During the time spent on MSR security, the squadron suffered two casualties.

1-75 CAV returned to Iraq in support of Operation Iraqi Freedom in October 2007 and redeployed to Fort Campbell in late November 2008. 1-75 CAV deployed to Afghanistan in support of Operation Enduring Freedom in June 2010 and returned in April 2011. It deployed to Iraq as part of Task Force Strike in summer 2016 and returned the following year.

1-75 CAV partook in US Army AFRICOM's annual exercise African Lion in March 2019, with units traveling to Morocco and Tunisia to support the exercise, returning the following April.

Organization 
1-75 CAV is organized into 5 troops; a headquarters and headquarters troop; two mounted reconnaissance troops; and one dismounted reconnaissance troop. A forward support company from the 526th Brigade Support Battalion is attached to the squadron to provide logistical and maintenance support. The squadron is manned primarily by the 19 series MOS (Armor/Cavalry) enlisted men and officers. 11 series MOS (Infantry) enlisted men and officers man the mortar sections and dismounted recon troop, among others.

Headquarters and Headquarters Troop (Hellcat Troop); the squadron's headquarters providing administrative support, intelligence, command and control, and medical support to the squadron.

Alpha Troop ("Apache Troop"); a mounted cavalry reconnaissance troop. It has three mounted recon platoons, a mortar section, and a headquarters section.

Bravo Troop ("Bone Troop"); a mounted cavalry reconnaissance troop. It too has three mounted recon platoons, a mortar section, and a headquarters section.

Charlie Company ("Chaos Company"); a dismounted reconnaissance company. It has two dismounted recon platoons, a mortar section, a sniper section, and a headquarters section.

Delta Company ("Dealer Troop"): an attached forward support company from the brigade support battalion.

Current status
The 1-75 Cavalry deployed to Europe in support of OEADR POLAND in the summer of 2022. 1-75 CAV replaced a portion of 82nd Airborne troops.

 1-75 CAV is the Cavalry Squadron of the 2nd Brigade Combat Team, 101st Airborne Division stationed at Fort Campbell, Kentucky.It is the only unit of any size ever organized under the 75th Cavalry Regiment name.

See also
 United States Army branch insignia
 List of armored and cavalry regiments of the United States Army

References

 
 William K. Emerson, Encyclopedia of United States Army Insignia and Uniforms (page 51).

External links
 1-75 CAV at GlobalSecurity.org
 75th Cavalry heraldry

101st Airborne Division
075
Military units and formations established in 1941